5 Man Job is a remix album by Penal Colony, released in July 1995 by Cleopatra Records. The album comprises remixed versions of tracks from Put Your Hands Down, with contributions from Frontline Assembly's Bill Leeb, Genesis P Orridge, Leather Strip, Spahn Ranch's Matt Green, and T.H.D.

Reception
Aiding & Abetting commended 5 Man Job for its experimentation and variety. Sonic Boom claimed the material sounded too removed from Penal Colony's former sound, saying "I couldn't help but wonder where the band is among all the music" and "this may seem a bit harsh, but the remixes don't sound anything alike, even when it's the same track, the music totally originates from the band mixing the track."

Track listing

Personnel 
Adapted from the 5 Man Job liner notes.

Penal Colony
 Jason Hubbard – sampler, programming, drum programming
 Dee Madden – lead vocals, sampler, programming, design
 Andy Shaw – electric guitar, backing vocals
 Chris Shinkus – bass guitar, backing vocals, design

Additional musicians
 Rhys Fulber – remixing and programming (1–5)
 Matt Green – remixing and programming (9)
 Michael Hateley – backing vocals (12)
 Claus Larsen – remixing and keyboards (7, 8)
 Bill Leeb – remixing and programming (1–5)
 Genesis P-Orridge – remixing and production (9–11)
 Shawn Rudiman – remixing (12)
 Larry Thrasher – remixing and production (9–11)
 Ed Vargo – remixing (12)
Production and additional personnel
 Judson Leach – mastering, remixing and programming (9)
 Brian Mars – design

Release history

References

External links 
 

1995 remix albums
Penal Colony albums
Cleopatra Records albums